Dominik Koll (born 24 December 1984) is an Austrian former swimmer, who specialized in freestyle events. He is a two-time Olympian, a 41-time national titleholder, and a 5-time long and short course Austrian record holder. Koll is a member of the swimming team for SK VÖEST Linz. He won a bronze medal, as a member of the Austrian swimming team, at the 2008 European Championships in Eindhoven, Netherlands. Koll is one of few LGBT Olympians to come out as gay.

Swimming career
Koll made his Olympic debut at the 2004 Summer Olympics in Athens, competing in the men's 200 m freestyle. Koll cruised to fourth place in his heat and twenty-fifth overall by 0.53 of a second behind Latvia's Romāns Miloslavskis in 1:51.36.

Four years after competing in his first Olympics, Koll qualified for his second Austrian team at the 2008 Summer Olympics in Beijing. As a 23-year old, he swam a FINA A-cut time of 1:48.21 at the European Championships in Eindhoven, Netherlands. At the 2008 Summer Olympics in Beijing, Koll set a new Austrian mark in the 200 m freestyle and recorded the sixteenth fastest time of 1:47.81 on the second night of preliminaries to secure the final spot in the semifinals. The following morning, Koll failed to qualify for the final, as he finished his semifinal run with a fourth-slowest time of 1:47.87, just 0.06 of a second off his record from the preliminaries.

Two days later, Koll swam the start-off leg of the men's 4×200 m freestyle relay, recording his individual-split time of 1:47.72. Koll and his teammates David Brandl, Markus Rogan, and Florian Janistyn finished the second heat in fifth place and ninth overall, for another national record-breaking time of 7:11.45.

Shortly after the Olympics, Koll set another national record in the 400 m freestyle at the 2008 European Short Course Swimming Championships, with a time of 3:39.82. The following year, he posted his fifth-career Austrian record time of 1:43.90 by finishing eighth in the preliminary heats of the men's 200 m freestyle at the European Short Course Swimming Championships in Istanbul, Turkey.

Koll is a current member of the swimming team for Columbia Lions, and a film and economics major at Columbia University in New York, New York.

References

External links
Profile – Columbia Lions
NBC Olympics Profile

1984 births
Gay sportsmen
Living people
Austrian male freestyle swimmers
Olympic swimmers of Austria
Swimmers at the 2004 Summer Olympics
Swimmers at the 2008 Summer Olympics
Austrian LGBT sportspeople
LGBT swimmers
Sportspeople from Linz
Columbia Lions men's swimmers
European Aquatics Championships medalists in swimming
21st-century LGBT people